The Craving is a 1916 American silent drama film directed by Charles Bartlett starring William Russell, Charlotte Burton, and Rae Berger.

Cast
 William Russell as Foster Calhoun
 Rae Berger as Leroy Calhoun
 Charlotte Burton as Roby
 Helene Rosson as Margaret Cummings
 Roy Stewart as Oliver Bailey
 Robert Miller as Crooky

External links

1916 films
1916 drama films
Silent American drama films
American silent feature films
American black-and-white films
1910s American films